Open Kernel Labs (OK Labs) is a privately owned company that develops microkernel-based hypervisors and operating systems for embedded systems. The company was founded in 2006 by Steve Subar and Gernot Heiser as a spinout from NICTA. It was headquartered in Chicago, while research and development was located in Sydney, Australia. The company was acquired by General Dynamics in September 2012.

Products

OKL4 Microvisor
The OKL4 Microvisor is an open-source software system software platform for embedded systems that can be used as a hypervisor, and as a simple real-time operating system with memory protection. It is a variant of the L4 microkernel. OKL4 is a Type I hypervisor and runs on single- and multi-core processors based on ARM, MIPS, and x86 processors.

OKL4 has been deployed on over 2 billion mobile phones, both as a baseband processor operating system and for hosting guest operating systems. Most notable and visible is the company's design win at Motorola for the Evoke QA4 messaging phone, the first phone which employs virtualization to support two concurrent operating systems (Linux and Binary Runtime Environment for Wireless (BREW)) on one processor core.

Paravirtualized guest OSes
OK Labs also supplies ready-to-integrate paravirtualized guest application operating systems, including OK:Symbian (SymbianOS), OK:Linux (Linux), OK:Windows (Windows) and OK:Android (Android).

Hardware virtualization
The OKL4 Microvisor supports ARM hardware virtualization extensions, as introduced in the Cortex-A15 processor. The use of hardware virtualization greatly reduces the changes required to a guest OS.

Background
OK Labs and OKL4 are the result of collaboration among academia, business, and open-source development. OK Labs technology is derived from the L4 microkernel which originated in the early 1990s at German research Lab GMD, further developed at IBM Watson Research Center, the University of Karlsruhe in Germany, the University of New South Wales and NICTA in Australia. As commercial ventures, OK Labs and OKL4 were launched by NICTA in 2006, with further investment by Citrix and other venture partners. OK Labs technology continues to benefit from ties to academia and research projects, to NICTA, and to the global open-source community.

Acquisition
The company was acquired by General Dynamics in September 2012 and has since closed its Sydney office. In February 2014, Cog Systems was founded by former Open Kernel Labs staff and continued OKL4 development in Sydney. In April 2019, Cog Systems went into liquidation and closed.

See also
Wombat (operating system)

References

External links
 
 Open Kernel Labs homepage
 Open Kernel Labs Community Wiki
 NICTA home page
 Cog Systems home page
 

Virtualization software
Mobile computers
Software companies based in Illinois
Software companies of the United States